L'Agullola is a mountain of the Guilleries Massif, Catalonia, Spain. It has an elevation of 921.9 metres above sea level. The plateau known as Pla de Fàbregues lies NW of the summit. L'Agullola Grossa is a sharp rocky outcrop rising just SE of the cliff wall.

References

Mountains of Catalonia